The 10 examples of the Class D V (pronounced "D 5") steam engine belonging the Royal Bavarian State Railways (Königlich Bayerische Staatsbahn) were the first six-coupled tank locomotives in Bavaria. They were intended specifically for working the hilly route between Plattling and Eisenstein. Because they did not deliver the expected performance, however, they were soon relegated to shunting duties. 

That said, all 10 engines went into the Reichsbahn, where they were incorporated into the numbering plan as the Class 89.81. However, they were soon replaced by Class 89.6, the ex-Bavarian R 3/3 engines. They began to be taken out of service in 1925. The last two, numbers 89 8106 and 89 8107 were retired in 1928.

See also 
 Royal Bavarian State Railways
 List of Bavarian locomotives and railbuses

References

0-6-0T locomotives
D 05
Standard gauge locomotives of Germany
Maffei locomotives
Railway locomotives introduced in 1877
C n2t locomotives

Freight locomotives